Curious Corn is the seventh studio album by English band Ozric Tentacles. It was released in 1997 on Snapper Music.

Track listing 

 "Spyroid" (Geelani, Wynne) – 3:47
 "Oolite Grove" (Ozric Tentacles) – 5:57
 "Afroclonk" (Ozric Tentacles) – 8:06
 "Curious Corn" (Ozric Tentacles) – 10:56
 "Oddentity" (Prince, Wynne) – 7:00
 "Papyrus" (Egan, Wynne) – 5:32
 "Meander" (Ozric Tentacles) – 5:12

Personnel 

 John Egan – flute
 Rad (Conrad Prince) – drums
 Seaweed (Christopher Lenox-Smith) – synthesizers
 Ed Wynne – synthesizers, guitars
 Zia Geelani – bass
 B.L.I.M. – back cover, cover art
 Simon Eddie Baker – liner notes

References 

1997 albums
Ozric Tentacles albums